Indian heat wave can refer to a number of major heat waves that have occurred in India: 

2002 Indian heat wave, major heat wave concentrated in Andhra Pradesh
2015 Indian heat wave, 2015 heat wave which impacted most of the country
2016 Indian heat wave, a heat wave in India impacting 330 million people
2019 heat wave in India and Pakistan, 2019 heat wave in India and Pakistan
2022 India–Pakistan heat wave, 2022 heat wave in India and neighboring countries